Arkangel can refer to:

Arkangel (magazine), an animal liberation magazine.
"Arkangel" (Black Mirror), an episode of anthology series Black Mirror
Ark Angel, a book in the Alex Rider series by Anthony Horowitz.
Arkhangelsk, Russia, a city also known as Archangel
Arkangel de la Muerte (1966–2018), professional wrestler also known as Arkangel
Arkangel, a heavy metal Venezuelan rock band founded by Paul Gillman and Freddy Marshall

See also 
 Archangel (disambiguation)